John Jacob Calhoun Koon Farmstead is a historic home and farm located near Ballentine, Richland County, South Carolina, USA. The house was built in about 1890, and is a two-story farmhouse with a two-tiered Victorian influenced wraparound porch. It has a one-story, gable roofed frame rear addition. Also on the property are the contributing frame grain barn (c. 1920), a frame cotton house (c. 1900), a frame workshop/toolhouse (c. 1900), a late-19th century shed, a planing shed (c. 1920) and a sawmill (c. 1928).

It was added to the National Register of Historic Places in 1986.

References 

Farms on the National Register of Historic Places in South Carolina
Victorian architecture in South Carolina
Houses completed in 1890
Houses in Richland County, South Carolina
National Register of Historic Places in Richland County, South Carolina